Events from the year 1727 in Canada.

Incumbents
French Monarch: Louis XV
British and Irish Monarch: George I (died June 11), George II (starting June 11)

Governors
Governor General of New France: Charles de la Boische, Marquis de Beauharnois
Colonial Governor of Louisiana: Pierre Dugué de Boisbriand then Étienne Perier
Governor of Nova Scotia: Lawrence Armstrong
Governor of Placentia: Samuel Gledhill

Events

Births
 January 2 - James Wolfe, British Army officer (died 1759)
 February 7 - Charles Deschamps de Boishébert et de Raffetot, military (died 1797)
 March 23 - Philippe-François de Rastel de Rocheblave, soldier, businessman and political figure in Lower Canada (died 1802)

Deaths
 November 10 - Alphonse de Tonty, officer (born 1659)
 December 26 - Jean-Baptiste de La Croix de Chevrières de Saint-Vallier (born 1653)

Historical documents
Nova Scotia councillor is present as Nanrantsouak and other nations ratify peace treaty and discuss issues with New England leaders

Ratification article obliges all parties, settler and Indigenous, to send fighters for united response to attack on any party

Nova Scotia Council reviews letter from Councillor Mascarene on ratification, including "mutual assistance" article

Lt. Gov. Dummer will invoke mutual assistance to get Penobscot to pursue Cape Sable Indigenous people who attacked boats

Dummer and Nanrantsouak chief sachem discuss return of British settlers taken by Indigenous people

Indigenous people note price increase for goods they want and decrease for beaver, and Dummer explains "the Nature of Markets"

Report that "Cape Sable Indians" killed all aboard vessel, danced on shore around their scalps and took some to Louisbourg

"Antimonarchical" Bostonians with Acadians undermine Nova Scotia government and incite Indigenous attack (Note: "savages" used)

Nova Scotia Council decides French "up the Bay" of Fundy refusing to swear allegiance will not be dealing with "our English Traders"

Acadian Deputies insist that oath have clauses allowing free exercise of religion, exemption from military, and property rights

For refusing unconditional oath to King George II, Acadian Deputies are imprisoned and inhabitants prohibited from fishing

Questioning Indigenous men from local regions about reported murder, Council invokes their treaty obligation to make amends

Nova Scotia governor calls for troops at Minas and Chignecto, for Canso fort, and setting up military recruits as settlers after four-year tour

Detailed proposal to grant poor people 50 acres, craftsmen 100 acres and "substantial inhabitants" 1,000 in Nova Scotia (Note: "savage" used)

Much Nova Scotia fish (and most from Canso) sold in Île-Royale, which is also "constantly supply'd from Boston with all sorts of commodities"

Merchants complain about high-handed Placentia commander taking best fishing places, overcharging for goods and abusing people

Newfoundlanders spend winter cutting boards, making oars, building and repairing boats, and repairing structures, while others hunt

Newfoundland shore fish preferable to Grand Banks fish because latter are "in bulk before[...]wash'd out, and is broke [before] spread"

British have right to oppose French at Niagara because Six Nations in "entire subjection to H.M. did surrender all their lands to him"

New York is building "stone house of strength" at Oswego, "lying most conveniently to receive all the far Indians who come to trade with us"

N.Y. General Assembly praises governor's "zeal for[...]securing the Six Nations in the British interest" by building Oswego trading house

Very few "Adirondacks" remain after Six Nations victories, and are not "of any consequence, either in Peace or War" (Note: racial stereotypes

Montreal priest admonishes apostasy of woman gone to New England, citing Catholic doctrine and censuring Protestantism

Devonshire man seeks New England posting as "reward for[...]taking seven sail of sloops etc. manned by Indians who attacked" Canso fishery

"Melancholy, distressful, horrid" - Few survive 12 days at sea in boat without drinking water before reaching Newfoundland

Unusually, this news (that French army will put Louis XV's father-in-law on Polish throne) comes to New York by way of Île-Royale and Canso

References

 
Canada
27